Blepharomastix randalis is a moth in the family Crambidae. It was described by Herbert Druce in 1895. It is found in Mexico.

The forewings and hindwings are silky white. The former crossed by three and the latter by two brownish-black lines, the costal and outer margins of the forewings and the outer margin of the hindwings is blackish brown.

References

Moths described in 1895
Blepharomastix